El Jardin del Mar ("The Garden of the Sea" in Spanish) is a community located in Pasadena, Texas, United States. Places within El Jardin have Seabrook, Texas postal addresses. Most of El Jardin's residents are those of the working class.

El Jardin del Mar faces the Galveston Bay and is located northeast of Seabrook and southeast of Shoreacres.

El Jardin del Mar Community Association has copies of Lucille B. Klopp's privately published 2002 book A History of El Jardin del Mar.

Government and infrastructure
Pasadena Volunteer Fire Department operates Fire Station #9 at 4907 Donald Street.

Harris Health System (formerly Harris County Hospital District) designated Strawberry Health Center in Pasadena for ZIP code 77586. The nearest public hospital is Ben Taub General Hospital in the Texas Medical Center.

Education

El Jardin is within the Clear Creek Independent School District. The community is within the Board of Trustees District 1, represented by Robert Allan Davee as of 2008.

Schools serving the community include Bay Elementary School in Seabrook, Seabrook Intermediate School in Seabrook, and Clear Falls High School in League City. Residents were previously zoned to Clear Lake High School in Clear Lake City, Houston.

The portion of Clear Creek ISD in Harris County (and therefore El Jardin del Mar) is assigned to San Jacinto College.

References

External links

 El Jardin del Mar Community Association
Jardines pequeños

Geography of Pasadena, Texas
Geography of Harris County, Texas